Martha a Tena is a Czech music duo whose members are sisters Martha Elefteriadu and Tena Elefteriadu.

Martha Elefteriadu (born 12 September 1946 Bulkes, Yugoslavia) is a Czech singer of Greek origin, half of the duo Martha a Tena, together with her sister Tena.

Tena Elefteriadu, born as Partena Elefteriadu (born 16 April 1948) is a Czech singer of Greek origin, member of the duo Martha a Tena.

Personal life 
Their family emigrated from Greece because of the Greek Civil War and settled in 1950 in former Czechoslovakia. Their mother died while they were children, so they grew up in orphanages, they went through 5 of them, including one in Ivančice.

Martha, after matura at a gymnasium (school) studied first general medicine, then changed major to psychology, and graduated from Charles University in Prague.

Tena has a son Marko Elefteriadis, a rapper who performs under stage name Ektor.

Career
At the end of the 1960s the sisters met a guitarist Aleš Sigmund from band Vulkán, who helped them create strong creative and musical foundations. Their first records are from 1968, in 1970 they released their first LP record with Panton Records Dál než slunce vstává. They quickly established themselves in Czech Pop music. They collaborated with many notable artists. Martha and Tena enchiched Czech culture with their southern temperament and Greek spontaneity.

Currently their repertoire is focused on Greek folk songs and they also teach Greek dances.

Martha occasionally hosts a radio show Noční Mikrofórum at Český Rozhlas Dvojka.

Discography

LP 
 Dál než slunce vstává – Panton 1970
 Hrej dál – Panton 1972
 Modré království – Panton 1973
 Ať se múzy poperou – Panton 1975
 Řecké prázdniny – Panton 1977
 Kresby tuší – Panton 1980
 A desky dál stárnou – Panton 1983

CD 
 Nejkrásnější řecké písně – Multisonic 1992
 Martha a Tena The best of 1969–1982 – Panton 1993
 Děti z Pirea – B.M.G. 1995
 Kresby tuší – Martha Elefteriadu Supraphon 2000
 Řecké prázdniny a největší hity – Supraphon 2001
 Řecké slunce – B.M.B. 2001
 Ať se múzy poperou – 24 hitů – Supraphon 2006
 V rytmu řeckého tance – Popron 2006

Sources 
 Martha Elefteriadu: Málem z nás byly Maďarky interview in Deník (in Czech)

See also 
 Bratislavská lýra
 Greeks in the Czech Republic

References

External links 
 List of works in National Library of the Czech Republic whose author or topic is Martha Elefteriadu
 [/ Oficiál pages of Martha a Tena Elefteriadu]
 řecké tance
 řecké tance u nás
 Martha Elefteriadu at czechmusic.net

English-language singers from the Czech Republic
Czech-language singers
Modern Greek-language singers
20th-century Czech women singers
Czech people of Greek descent
20th-century Greek women singers
Living people
Czech musical groups
Female musical duos
Sibling musical duos
21st-century Greek women singers
21st-century Czech women singers
Year of birth missing (living people)
People from Ivančice